Sir William Clayton, 1st Baronet (died 1744) of Marden Park, Surrey and later Harleyford, was an English politician who sat in the House of Commons from 1715 to 1744.

Clayton was the eldest surviving son of  William Clayton of Hambleden, Buckinghamshire. He married Martha Kenrick, the daughter of John Kenrick, a London merchant. He was the nephew and heir of Sir Robert Clayton, a wealthy banker and former Lord Mayor of London who had bought the manor of Bletchingley in 1677, and with it control of both seats in the parliamentary borough of Bletchingley.

Clayton returned himself as a Member of Parliament (MP) for this rotten borough at the  1715 British general election. He was returned as MP again in 1722, 1727, 1734 and  1741. He voted with the Administration in all known divisions, except when he voted with the opposition in 1719 on the Peerage Bill and in 1730 on the Hessians. 
   

Clayton was created a baronet of Marden in 1732.  In 1735 he also bought the manor of Harleyford, near Great Marlow, which gave him control of one of the two parliamentary seats of the borough of Great Marlow.

Clayton died on 28 December 1744 leaving five sons and five daughters. He was succeeded in the baronetcy by his eldest son, Kenrick, who was in turn succeeded by his son Robert. Robert died childless, and the baronetcy passed to the 1st baronet's grandson William, who was the son of the first baronet's younger son William. Clayton's daughter Anne married John Thomas, who was a family tutor and later became Bishop of Rochester.

References 
 

Year of birth unknown
1744 deaths
Baronets in the Baronetage of Great Britain
Members of the Parliament of Great Britain for English constituencies
British MPs 1715–1722
British MPs 1722–1727
British MPs 1727–1734
British MPs 1734–1741
British MPs 1741–1747
People from Buckinghamshire